Kevin Roy (born 21 April 1963) is a Canadian weightlifter. He competed in the men's heavyweight I event at the 1984 Summer Olympics.

References

External links
 

1963 births
Living people
Canadian male weightlifters
Olympic weightlifters of Canada
Weightlifters at the 1984 Summer Olympics
Sportspeople from Greater Sudbury
Commonwealth Games medallists in weightlifting
Commonwealth Games gold medallists for Canada
Commonwealth Games bronze medallists for Canada
Pan American Games medalists in weightlifting
Pan American Games gold medalists for Canada
Weightlifters at the 1983 Pan American Games
Weightlifters at the 1982 Commonwealth Games
Weightlifters at the 1986 Commonwealth Games
20th-century Canadian people
21st-century Canadian people
Medallists at the 1982 Commonwealth Games
Medallists at the 1986 Commonwealth Games